Aandhi-Toofan is a 1985 Indian Hindi-language film directed by B.Subhash, starring  Shashi Kapoor, Hema Malini, Shatrughan Sinha, Mithun Chakraborty, Meenakshi Sheshadri and Danny Denzongpa.

Plot
Notorious biker-gangster Balvir (Danny Denzongpa) kills Inspector Ranjit Singh (Shashi Kapoor), who has arrested Balvir. After Killing Ranjit, Balvir removes Sheela's clothes and strips her naked and rapes her very brutally. Now Sheela has only one purpose, to take revenge on Balvir Thakur.
Sheela (Hema Malini), hires two men, Raghunath Shastri "Raghu" (Shatrughan Sinha) and Balwant Yadav "Ballu" (Mithun Chakraborty), to capture Balvir alive and bring him to her.

Cast
Shashi Kapoor as Inspector Ranjit Singh
Hema Malini as Sheela R. Singh
Shatrughan Sinha as Raghunath 'Raghu' Shastri
Mithun Chakraborty as Balwant 'Ballu' Yadav
Meenakshi Sheshadri as Meena Kapoor
Danny Denzongpa as Balvir
Raj Kiran as Jaanu
Kaajal Kiran as Banu
Mazhar Khan as Balvir's Man
Mac Mohan as Balvir's Man
Sudhir as Balvir's Man
Tej Sapru as Balvir's Man
Manik Irani as Balvir's Man
Om Shivpuri as Mr. Kapoor
Sulochana Latkar as Jaanu's Mother
Raj Mehra
Paintal as Ballu's Friend
Jagdish Raj as I.G.P.
Sajjan as Sheela's Servant
Pinchoo Kapoor as Mr. Singh
Chand Usmani as Mrs. Singh

Soundtrack
Lyrics: Anjaan

References

External links
 

1985 films
1980s Hindi-language films
Indian action films
Films scored by Bappi Lahiri
Films directed by Babbar Subhash
1985 action films